Dawn Wetzel Keefer (born October 6, 1972) is an American politician from Pennsylvania, currently representing the 92nd District in the Pennsylvania House of Representatives.

Early life and education 
Keefer was born on October 6, 1972 in Gettysburg, Pennsylvania.  She graduated from Gettysburg Area High School in 1991. In 1995, Keefer earned a BA degree in Government and Politics from George Mason University.

Career 
Keefer has served in the Pennsylvania House of Representatives, representing the 92nd district, since 2017. She was initially elected in 2016 and won reelection in 2018, 2020, and 2022.

In 2020, Keefer was among 26 Pennsylvania House Republicans who called for the reversal of Joe Biden's certification as the winner of Pennsylvania's electoral votes in the 2020 United States presidential election, citing false claims of election irregularities.

Keefer is the chairwoman of the Pennsylvania State Freedom Caucus.

Personal life 
Keefer's husband is Tom. They have three children and live in Dillsburg, Pennsylvania.

References

1972 births
Living people
Republican Party members of the Pennsylvania House of Representatives
People from Dillsburg, Pennsylvania
21st-century American politicians